Agonopterix hypericella is a moth of the family Depressariidae. It is found from Fennoscandia to Italy, Austria and Slovakia and from Germany and Switzerland to Russia. It has also been recorded from Bulgaria.

The wingspan is 15–17 mm. Adults are on wing from February to September.

The larvae feed on Hypericum species.

References

External links
Lepiforum.de

Moths described in 1817
Agonopterix
Moths of Europe